Jeev Zala Yeda Pisa is an Indian Marathi-language television series. It is premiered from 1 April 2019 and stopped on 3 April 2021 on Colors Marathi and produced by Vinod Lavekar and Nikhil Sheth. It is written by Chinmay Mandlekar.

Plot 
The story is set in rural backdrop, revolves around two completely opposite personalities, Shiva and Siddhi and their journey from hate to love despite their differences. 

Shiva is a good person but opted to work as a goon  for a shrewd politician Chandrakantha Deshmane (Atyabai) and serves her faithfully . He is not very educated but as a political worker, and hotel owner, he earns well and wealthy. Atyabai faces stiff opposition from her political rival Narpat Chikne whom Shiva considers as enemy. Meanwhile, Siddhi is an educated woman who holds on to her principles.

The story starts with a misunderstanding, where Siddhi lodges a complaint to police against Shiva for misbehaving with a girl which leads to his arrest. After knowing that it was Siddhi who was behind his humiliation and arrest, furious Shiva kidnaps her on the night of her marriage. Her marriage was called off and the family faced embarrassment. As the incident become known to the people of Rudrayat, Atyabai forcefully fixed Shiva and Siddhi’s marriage for her political benefit. After her marriage with Shiva, Siddhi aims to take revenge, but in the process she realizes that Shiva has a loving family, particularly his father, sister (Sonal) and aunt (Vijaya kaki). Slowly she develops a bonding with them. Meanwhile, Shiva, who lives in the memory of his deceased lover Sayali, finally realizes that life has given him a second chance. Despite many fights, obstacles and misunderstandings, the duo eventually fall in love. 

The highlight of the show is the surmari (a diving competition) sequence, which is the high point of the serial. The sequence shows how Siddhi wrongly interpreted Shiva’s intention as she was misguided and misled by Narpat. Her act puts Shiva’s life in danger and as she realises her mistake, and she immediately saved his life in a dramatic sequence. While Shiva battles for his life in hospital, Siddhi slowly learns the true nature of Shiva from villagers, his well-wishers and friends. Finally, she learns about his innocence and comes to know that Shiva never misbehaved with any girl and it was all her misunderstandings that leads to hatred. Regretful Siddhi apologises for her mistakes and starts falling for Shiva. The story continues with their love story and how they bond against all odds.

Being together, Shiva and siddhi continue to face troubles from Shiva’s mother (Mangal Lashkare). Meanwhile, mystery of Siddhi’s birth takes the center point after 400 episodes. It was later revealed that she is the daughter of Atyabai.
.

Cast

Main 
 Ashok Phal Dessai as Shiva Yashwant Lashkare
 Vidula Chougule as Siddh Nandakumar Gokarna / Siddhi Shiva Lashkare

Recurring 
 Mohan Joshi / Uday Tikekar as Yashwant Lashkare (Shiva's father)
 Chinmayee Sumeet as Chandrakanta Deshmane (Aatyabai)
 Unknown as Ishwar Gokarna
 Ruplaxmi Shinde as Malini Ishwar Gokarna
 Anup Belwalkar as Sagar Ishwar Gokarna
 Sharvari Jog as Sonal Yashwant Lashkare (Shiva's sister)
 Vidya Sawale as Mangal Yashwant Lashkare (Shiva's mother)
 Sumedha Datar as Vijaya Lashkare (Shiva's aunt)
 Vikas Patil as Janardan Lakshman Waghmare (Jalwa)
 Rohit Kokate as Narpat Chikane
 Rohit Haldikar as Sarkar (Aatyabai's son)
 Hemant Joshi as Mr. Bhave (Aatyabai's right hand)
 Amey Barve as Siddhi's boyfriend

Adaptations

References

External links 
 
 Jeev Zala Yeda Pisa at Voot

Marathi-language television shows
2019 Indian television series debuts
Colors Marathi original programming
2021 Indian television series endings